Mekton is a role-playing game which centers on the conventions of mecha anime and science fiction (although it can easily enough be adapted to other genres like police drama or high fantasy). It has seen several editions since its introduction in 1984, the most recent, Mekton Zeta (メクトン Z; a reference to the seminal mecha anime series Mobile Suit Zeta Gundam) being first published in 1994.

Mekton was the first anime role-playing game available in North America; the anime influence was muted compared to later editions, but this is in parallel with North America's growing exposure to and awareness of anime in general. The use of katakana to represent the title of the game begins with the "Zeta" edition and may or may not be carried over into future editions. A "fourth edition," usually referred to as Mekton Double Zeta and assumed to be using the Fuzion System rules (Mekton II and Mekton Z use the older Interlock System), has been rumored to be in development by publishers R. Talsorian Games since 1997.  According to designer Mike Pondsmith, one of the biggest stumbling blocks to the introduction of a new edition is a lack of a true "generic" pre-made campaign setting for the game.  Mekton is a moderately supported system (though no new official material has been released since 1996), with a very active albeit small fanbase, centered on the Mekton Zeta Mailing List, an ezmlm based mailing list active since the fall of 1996.

The intricate detail of the mecha that can be built in Mekton is both the game's biggest strength and biggest drawback; while nearly anything can be built with the game's construction system, from personal armor to gigantic spaceships, it is very time-consuming and can make it nearly impossible to play a quick "pick-up" game.

Within the context of the RPG, mecha are referred to as "mektons," abbreviated as "meks" and sometimes alternately called "suits" (as in "power suits" or power armor).  Several official settings have been published.

Mekton II is an important historical artifact in that it was among the first RPG books to use the then-new technique of desktop publishing. Mekton Zeta has a more pronounced anime influence than the previous two editions; the full cover title of this edition if read in Japanese and translated into English reads "Super Dimension Mobile Warrior Mekton Z", the title of the game referring to both Macross (The Super Dimension Fortress Macross) and Gundam (Mobile Suit Gundam).

History
Mike Pondsmith decided to self-publish a game which originated in his interest in the Mobile Suit Gundam manga which he combined with the Imperial Star game system, which he had designed for his own amusement: the result was the "white box edition" of Mekton (1984), a game of giant robot combat. Mekton was designed by Pondsmith and Mike Jones and published as a boxed set with a 32-page book, a large color map, two cardstock counter sheets, and dice. Pondsmith founded R. Talsorian Games in 1985, then put out a second edition of Mekton (1986) through the new company; the game was now packaged as a 100-page rulebook rather than a box. The second edition rulebook also included counters and two maps. Mekton II (1987) – the third edition of the game – made use of the company's Interlock System. Mekton II was designed by Pondsmith and published as a 96-page book, and included art by Ben Dunn. Mekton received a fourth edition called Mekton Zeta (1994). R. Talsorian published a reprint of that game as the ANimechaniX-branded Mekton Zeta (2000).

Contents
The first edition of Mekton was a science-fiction system of combat between giant robots, drawing on Japanese animation for inspiration - the first of its type. The second edition from 1985 would add basic role-playing rules. The game covers character and robot construction and combat, including a boardgame-combat-resolution system, plus historical background for the world of Algol and an introductory scenario.

Mekton II is a complete revision of the original Mekton rules, including expanded character generation and political info on Algol. This version is compatible with Cyberpunk.

Editions of Mekton
 "White Box" Mekton (1984) - not a role-playing game, rather a boxed tactical war-game including counters and maps.
 Mekton (1985) - softcover book using a custom percentile-based task resolution system. Notable for having misspelled its own name in the katakana.
 Roadstriker (1986) - rules for human-scale transformable vehicles and power suit mecha, more advanced transformable mecha design options, and a police drama adventure
 Mekton II (1987) - converted Mekton to run on the Interlock System, later used in Cyberpunk 2020.  Cover art by Ben Dunn.
 Roadstriker II (1990) - rules for human-scale transformable vehicles and power suit mecha, more advanced transformable mecha design options, and a police drama adventure converted to the Mekton II system.
 Operation Rimfire (ca. 1990) - campaign book. A very Gundam-esque adventure in which representatives of both major political factions on Algol are sent on a long-range interplanetary mission to determine the nature of an anomaly at the edge of the star system. Written to be played as 'episodes' in a 'series'. (Reference was made in this book and the later Mekton Empire that the anomaly was in actuality a nonfunctional stargate such as is used in the Bendarian Empire.)
 Mekton Techbook/Mekton Technical System (MTB/MTS) (1991) - a major conversion of the mecha-building system of Mekton
 Mekton Empire - This expansion book reduced the Algol system to just one more star among hundreds in the Bendarian Galactic Empire.
 Mekton Zeta (メクトン Z) (1994) - general update and improvement of Mekton II
 Mekton Zeta Plus (メクトン Z プラス) (1994) - general update and improvement of the Mekton Techbook
Gundam Senki (2000) - Japanese language Mobile Suit Gundam RPG using the Mekton system.  Scheduled for US release, release date unspecified at this time.
Mekton Zero (TBA) - crowdfunded project, on indefinite hiatus after being delayed for five years.

Official settings
 Algol - A "grab bag" setting in an alternate universe, mixing many different styles of anime together.  This setting originated with the first edition of Mekton, and was continued in the well-received expansion book Operation: Rimfire.  Algol was the default setting for Mekton and Mekton II (as well as Operation: Rimfire and Landstriker), and remains in Mekton Z for legacy purposes (as well as getting a passing reference in Mekton Empire). Algol is a long-lost human colony of the Bendar Galactic Empire, where the various factions are locked in a cold war and must deal with an impending ice age and the possible return of their ancient alien enemy, the fearsome Aggendi lizard warriors. The Algol Mailing List continued development on Algol into the early 2000s. 
 Mekton Empire - A space opera setting taking hints from Captain Harlock, Gundam and Voltron, set in the distant Bendar Spiral Galaxy. It added rules for playing aliens (including non-humanoids), space combat, psionics and creating new alien creatures.
 Jovian Chronicles - A heavily Gundam-inspired licensed setting created by Dream Pod 9, set in the 23rd Century.  This would later become a separate game using Dream Pod 9's Silhouette System.
 Invasion Terra - A Macross-like setting in the future of 2105. 
 Imperial Star - Very similar to Mekton Empire but set in the Milky Way Galaxy. This is considered as close to a 'default' campaign setting for Mekton Zeta as exists.
 Quicksilver Blues - Unreleased as of 2004 (complete since at least 2000).  As of 2005, Quicksilver Blues is being reworked into a new and separate role-playing game called "Era³" by its original developers, Atomic Rocket Games.
 Starblade Battalion - A Gundam-like setting, set in the far future of the Cyberpunk 2020 world (AD 2180).

Reception
Allen Varney reviewed Mekton in Space Gamer No. 72. Varney commented that "its slick appearance and novel topic will sucker any Japanese-robot fan who can't wait for one of the other robot games due out soon. Pass the word."

Phil Frances reviewed Mekton for White Dwarf #87, and stated that "In all, a most worthwhile effort – not as slick as FASA's Mechwarrior or Battletech, but admirably simple and flexible."

David Jacobs reviewed Mekton in Space Gamer/Fantasy Gamer No. 79. Jacobs commented that "Even if you've seen all of the Japanese animation featuring giant robots, I strongly suggest that you at least give it a once-over, because these guys and gals at R. Talsorian Games know how to put together a good game. this reviewed strongly suggests that Mekton is a must for any game shelf."

Reviews
Different Worlds #47

References

External links
MektonZeta.com, a semi-official fansite and the homepage of the Mekton Z Mailing List.
Mekton Alpha, an officially sanctioned "free" (but stripped down) version of Mekton Zeta.

  Mekton entry at the RPG Encyclopedia.
  Mekton First Edition entry at RPGnet RPG Game Index.

 
Fiction set around Algol
Mecha role-playing games
Mike Pondsmith games
R. Talsorian Games games
Role-playing games introduced in 1984